The 4th Hanoi International Film Festival opened on November 1 and closed on November 5, 2016, at Hanoi Friendship Cultural Palace, with the slogan "Cinema - Integration and Sustainable Development" (Vietnamese: "Điện ảnh - Hội nhập và phát triển bền vững").

From more than 500 films submitted, 146 films from 33 countries were selected for screening, of which 12 long films and 30 short films participated in the competition.

Programs
Ceremonies - At Hanoi Friendship Cultural Palace, 91 Trần Hưng Đạo Street, Hoàn Kiếm District:
 Opening ceremony: 20:00 Tuesday, November 1 (live broadcast on VTV2)
 Closing ceremony: 20:00 Saturday, November 5 (live broadcast on VTV1)

Professional activities - At Hanoi Daewoo Hotel, 360 Kim Mã Street, Ba Đình District:
 Exhibition of Vietnam Film Institute: Vietnamese context in foreign films (Vietnamese: "Bối cảnh Việt Nam trong phim nước ngoài"), from Tuesday morning, November 1 to November 5
 The HANIFF Campus and The Film Project Market: from Tuesday morning, November 1 to Friday evening, November 4. This year, these two activities are held in parallel.
 Seminars:
 Cooperation in film production and distribution among ASEAN countries (Vietnamese: "Hợp tác sản xuất, phát hành phim giữa các nước ASEAN"): Wednesday, November 2
 Indian cinema - cooperation and development (Vietnamese: "Điện ảnh Ấn Độ - hợp tác và phát triển"): Thursday, November 3
 Film showcase reception of The Way Station / Đảo của dân ngụ cư, directed by Hồng Ánh

Movie screenings in theaters:
6 cinemas in Hanoi participated in screening the film during the 5 days of the festival. The National Cinema Center is the only place to issue tickets for all cinema clusters, starting from October 29. All screenings are free.
 National Cinema Center (87 Láng Hạ Street) has 75 screenings with contested films of the two most important categories, which are contested feature-length films and contested short films. There are also Asean films, Indian films, films in the World Cinema Panorama program.
 Opening screenings: Tuesday afternoon, November 1, instead after the opening ceremony as before
 August Theater and Kim Đồng Theater (45 and 19 Hàng Bài Street) have 50 screenings, of which 28 are for Vietnamese films, 5 for Italian films and 17 for films in the World Cinema Panorama program.
 Ngọc Khánh Theater (523 Kim Mã Street) has 24 screenings, of which 3 are for short films, 3 for Vietnamese films, 6 for films in the World Cinema Panorama program, 7 for Asean films, 5 for Italian movies.
 CGV Cinemas, 6th floor, Vincom Center, 54A Nguyễn Chí Thanh Street
 CGV Cinemas, 5th floor, Mipec Tower, 229 Tây Sơn Street

Outdoor movie screenings and shows - At Lý Thái Tổ Monument Square, Hoàn Kiếm District:
 Movie Miracle in Milan  with Italian fashion show by designer Riccardo Bianco: Wednesday night, November 2
 Documentary SMTown: The Stage  and the exchange with Korean singer Jis and Juni from the group Offroad: Thursday night, November 3
 Movie Taxi, What’s Your Name? / Taxi, em tên gì?  with the Ao dai fashion show by designer Lan Hương: Friday night, November 4

Juries & Mentors

Juries
3 juries panels were established for this festival:

Feature film:
 Régis Wargnier , director, producer, screenwriter - Chairman
 Geraldine Chaplin , actress
 Adoor Gopalakrishnan , director, screenwriter, producer
 Iza Calzado , actress
 Đào Bá Sơn , director

Short film:
 Maxine Williamson , Artistic Director of Asia Pacific Screen Awards and Brisbane International Film Festival - Chairman
 Philip Cheah , film critic, founder of Singapore International Film Festival
 Nguyễn Thị Phương Hoa , animation director, animator

Network for Promotion of Asian Cinema (NETPAC):
 Ed Lejano , director, producer, managing director of QCinema International Film Festival - Chairman
 Udi Aloni , filmmaker, writer, visual artist
 Đoàn Minh Tuấn , screenwriter, Deputy Editor-in-Chief of Thế Giới Điện Ảnh Magazine

Mentors for the HANIFF Campus
Classes at the HANIFF Campus this year received instruction from:
 Jo Sung-hee , director
 Kwon Seung-hwi , screenwriter
 Maike Mia Höhne , Head of Berlinale Shorts of the Berlin International Film Festival

Official Selection - In Competition

Feature film
These 12 films were selected to compete for the official awards in Feature Film category:

The dagger  indicates films labeled NC 16
Highlighted title indicates Best Feature Film Award winner.

Short film
These 30 short films were selected to compete for official awards in Short Film category, divided into 5 screening sessions as follows:

Session 1:
 Mr. Mirror Man (Animated, 10′) 
 Three Variations on Ofelia (15′) 
 The Bridge (18′) 
 Love Comes Later (10′)  
 A New Home (15′) 
 I Love Anna (11′) 
 Young Mother on Vài Thai Peak / Người mẹ trẻ trên đỉnh Vài Thai (Docu., 29′) 

Session 2:
 Suspendu (15′) 
 To the Top (17′) 
 Day Before Chinese New Year (Documentary, 23′) 
 God Must Be Deaf (Animated, 8′) 
 Sweet Bloom of Nighttime Flower (15′) 
 Dedicated to Grandpa Điều / Dành tặng ông Điều (Documentary, 23′) 

Session 3:
 Study of a Singaporean Face (Documentary, 4′) 
 Heart of the Land (Documentary, 30′) 
 Distance Between Us (27′) 
 Different (6′) 
 Seide (12′) 
 Another City / Một thành phố khác (25′) 

Session 4:
 Sibol (18′) 
 Agus and Agus (16′) 
 Kousayla (20′)  
 The Moon of Seoul (22′) 
 Everlasting Hope / Vọng phu nơi đầu sóng (Documentary, 30′) 

Session 5:
 White Cat and Black Cat / Mèo Trắng và Mèo Mun (Animated, 10′) 
 The Surfaces / Những mặt phẳng (Animated, 10′) 
 The Sunflower / Bông hoa mặt trời (Animated, 10′) 
 Aspiration for Life / Khát vọng người (Documentary, 28′) 
 Pleco Fish / Cá dọn bể (13′) 
 Tomorrow / Ngày mai (15′) 
Highlighted title indicates Best Short Film Award winner.

Official Selection - Out of Competition
These films were selected for out-of-competition screening programs:

The dagger  indicates films labeled NC 16

Opening
 I, Daniel Blake – Ken Loach  

Panorama: World Cinema
Feature film

 3 Heroines / 3 Srikandi – Iman Brotoseno 
 3/4 – Maike Mia Höhne 
 All of a Sudden / Auf Einmal – Aslı Özge  
 Candy Boys / お江戸のキャンディー – Reona Hirota  
 Certified Dead – Marrie Lee 
 Cinemawala / সিনেমাওয়ালা – Kaushik Ganguly 
 Destiny / 喜禾 – Zhang Wei 
 Drought and Lies / دروغ, فیلم خشکسالی و دروغ – Pedram Alizadeh 
 Fate of a Man / Судьба человека – Sergei Bondarchuk 
 I Am Nojoom, Age 10 and Divorced / أنا نجوم بنت العاشرة ومطلقة – Khadija al-Salami 
 Immortality / جاودانگی – Mehdi Fard Ghaderi 
 Indochine – Régis Wargnier 
 Invisible / Imbisibol – Lawrence Fajardo 
 Junction 48 / ג'נקשן 48 – Udi Aloni  
 Lantouri / لانتوری – Reza Dormishian 
 Lenin Park / Parque Lenin – Itziar Leemans, Carlos Mignon 
 Let Her Cry / ඇගේ ඇස අග – Asoka Handagama  
 Lost Daughter / 台灣電影網 – Chen Yujie 
 Louder Than Bombs – Joachim Trier    
 Love, Supermoon – Wan Hasliza Wan Zainuddin 
 Love, Lies / 해어화 – Park Heung-sik 
 Masaan / मसान – Neeraj Ghaywan 
 My Skinny Sister / Min lilla syster – Sanna Lenken 
 Nakom – Kelly Daniela Norris, T. W. Pittman  
 News from Planet Mars / Des nouvelles de la planète Mars – Dominik Moll 
 Next to Me /  Pored mene – Stevan Filipović  
 Paradise Trips – Raf Reyntjens  
 Paths of the Soul / གངས་རིན་པོ་ཆེ (冈仁波齐) – Zhang Yang  (Documentary)
 River / ང་པོ། (河) – Sonthar Gyal  
 Shadow Kill / നിഴൽക്കുത്ത് – Adoor Gopalakrishnan 
 Southside with You – Richard Tanne 
 Son of Saul / Saul fia – László Nemes  
 Sunka Raku / Sunka Raku: Alegría Evanescente – Hari Sama  (Documentary)
 Tandem – King Palisoc  
 The Brand New Testament / Le Tout Nouveau Testament – Jaco Van Dormael   
 Timgad – Fabrice Benchaouche 
 Walnut Tree / Жаңғақ тал – Yerlan Nurmukhambetov 
 Wastelands – Miriam Heard  
 White Lies, Black Lies / 失控謊言 – Lou Yian 
 Wolf Totem / 狼图腾 – Jean-Jacques Annaud  
 Yen's Life / Cuộc đời của Yến – Đinh Tuấn Vũ 

Short filmBerlinale Shorts: Session 1 A Man Returned (30′)    
 Freud and Friends (30′)   
 Ten Meter Tower / Hopptornet (17′)  
 In the Soldier's Head (Animated, 4′)   
 Moms On Fire (Animated, 13′)  Berlinale Shorts: Session 2 Batrachian's Ballad / Balada de um Batráquio (Documentary, 11′)  
 Love (Animated, 15′)   
 Personne (15′)  
 Reluctantly Queer (8′)   
 Jin Zhi Xia Mao / Anchorage Prohibited (Documentary, 16′)  7 Letters: Singaporean Session Cinema (20′) 
 That Girl (18′) 
 The Flame (17′) 
 Bunga Sayang (12′) 
 Pineapple Town (15′) 
 Parting (12′) 
 GPS (Grandma Position System) (23′) World-wide Session When the Heron Flies (18′) 
 Barnyard Acer (Animated, 15′) 
 The Last Supper (6′) 
 Pickman's Model (Animated, 11′) 
 Operation Commando (21′) 
 Zéro m2 (19′) 
 The Dog's Lullaby (10′) 
 A Halt (6′) 
 The Teacher and Flowers / El maestro y la flor (Animated, 9′) 
 Returned (12′) 

Country-in-Focus: India 
 Brother Bajrangi / Bajrangi Bhaijaan – Kabir Khan (2015)
 In Greed We Trust / Moh Maya Money – Munish Bhardwaj (2016)
 Interrogation / Visaranai – Vetrimaaran (2015) 
 Sohra Bridge – Bappaditya Bandopadhyay (2016)
 The Quest / Pather Sandhan – Sikta Biswas (2016)

Country-in-Selection: Italy 
 Caterina in the Big City / Caterina va in città – Paolo Virzì (2003)
 Journey to Italy / Viaggio in Italia – Roberto Rossellini (1954)
 Me, Them and Lara / Io, loro e Lara – Carlo Verdone (2010)
 Miracle in Milan / Miracolo a Milano – Vittorio De Sica (1951)
 Rocco and His Brothers / Rocco e i suoi fratelli– Luchino Visconti (1960)

ASEAN Films

 Above It All / ນ້ອຍ (Noy) – Anysay Keola 
 Coffee Philosophy / Filosofi Kopi – Angga Dwimas Sasongko 
 Diamond Island / កោះពេជ្រ – Davy Chou  
 Jagat / ஜாகட் – Shanjey Kumar Perumal 
 The Island Funeral / มหาสมุทรและสุสาน (Maha samut lae susaan) – Pimpaka Towira
 The Return / 回乡 – Green Zeng 
 Water Lemon – Lemuel Lorca 
 What's So Special About Rina? / Ada Apa Dengan Rina – Harlif Haji Mohamad, Farid Azlan Ghani 
 Zodiac 12: Five Steps of Love / 12 chòm sao: Vẽ đường cho yêu chạy – Vũ Ngọc Phượng 

Contemporary Vietnamese Films 

 Bao giờ có yêu nhau / I'll Wait – Dustin Nguyễn
 Chàng trai năm ấy / Dandelion – Nguyễn Quang Huy
 Cô hầu gái / The Housemaid – Derek Nguyen
 Em là bà nội của anh / Sweet 20 – Phan Gia Nhật Linh
 Mỹ nhân / Beautiful Woman – Đinh Thái Thụy
 Nhà tiên tri / The Prophecy – Vương Đức
 Người trở về / Returnee – Đặng Thái Huyền
 Nữ đại gia / The Rich Woman – Lê Văn Kiệt
 Quyên / Farewell, Berlin Wall – Nguyễn Phan Quang Bình
 Taxi, em tên gì? / Taxi, What's Your Name? – Đỗ Đức Thịnh, Đinh Tuấn Vũ
 Tấm Cám: Chuyện chưa kể / Tam Cam: The Untold Story – Ngô Thanh Vân
 Thầu Chín ở Xiêm / Ho Chi Minh in Siam – Bùi Tuấn Dũng 
 Trên đỉnh bình yên / On the Peaceful Peak – Hữu Mười
 Truy sát / Tracer – Cường Ngô
 Yêu / Love – Việt Max

Outdoor Screening
 SMTown: The Stage – Bae Sung-sang  (Documentary)

Awards
The official awards were awarded at the closing ceremony of the festival, on the evening of November 5. The HANIFF Campus and Film Project Market organized their own awards ceremony for their participants in the previous night.

In Competition - Feature film
 Best Feature Film: Remember 
 Jury Prize for Feature Film: One Way Trip 
 Special Mention for Feature Film: Yellow Flowers on the Green Grass 
 Other nominees: Ordinary People , Blossoming Into a Family 
 Best Director: Eduardo Roy Jr. – Ordinary People 
 Other nominees: Choi Jeong-yeol – One Way Trip , Atom Egoyan – Remember 
 Best Leading Actor: Christopher Plummer – Remember 
 Other nominees: Joshua Lim – Fundamentally Happy , Ronwaldo Martin – Ordinary People 
 Best Leading Actress: Hasmine Killip – Ordinary People 
 Other nominees: Ninh Dương Lan Ngọc – Jackpot , Adibah Noor – Fundamentally Happy 

In Competition - Short film
 Best Short Film: Three Variations on Ofelia – Paulo Riqué 
 Jury Prize for Short Film: Heart of the Land – Kaisa 'Kaika' Astikainen 
 Other nominees: Study of a Singaporean Face – Kan Lumé & Megan Wonowidjoyo , Another City – Phạm Ngọc Lân , The Surfaces – Trần Khánh Duyên 
 Best Young Director of a Short Film: Phạm Ngọc Lân – Another City 

NETPAC Award
 NETPAC's Award for Asian Cinema Promotion: Green Carriage 

Audience Choice Award for Vietnamese Film
 Most Favourite In-Competition Film: Jackpot 
 Most Favourite Out-of-Competition Film: Taxi, What's Your Name? 

The HANIFF Campus
 Best Student - Producing Class: Nguyễn Hà Lê  Best Student - Screenwriting Class: Đào Thu Hằng  Best Student - Directing Class: Lê Quỳnh Anh, Hà Nguyễn Quang Thái, Nguyễn Lương Diệu Hằng (Team) The Film Project Market
 Best Project: One Summer Day – Wera Aung  Jury Prize for Film Project: Roommate Service – Nguyễn Lê Hoàng Việt '''
 Other nominees: XXYY – Nguyễn Mỹ Trang , Culi Never Cries – Phạm Ngọc Lân , Those Who Survive – Stuart Howe , Han Mac Tu prequel – Lê Hoàng An , 7 Bullets – Doris Young , Song in My Heart'' – Danny Đỗ

References

External links
 

2016 film festivals
Hanoi International Film Festival
2016 in Vietnam
2016 in Vietnamese cinema
November 2016 events in Vietnam